Boyett is an English surname which was brought to England after the Norman Conquest. Notable people with the surname include:
Lon Boyett (born 1953), American football player
Steve Boyett, writer and disc jockey based in Northern California
Theodore Boyett, American football coach in the United States
William Boyett (1927–2004), American actor

See also
Miller-Boyett Productions, American television production company that developed sitcoms from the 1970s through the 1990s